Lily's Driftwood Bay is a Northern Irish animated children's television series. Produced in Northern Ireland, the series premiered on Nick Jr. in the UK and Ireland on 5 May 2014 and it ended on 5 November 2017. It is created and produced by Sixteen South in association with Ingenious Media and with the participation of Nick Jr. and KiKA for season 2. It is based on an original idea and characters by Joanne Carmichael. The show uses paper cut-out animation.

Plot
A young sea-treasure hunter named Lily and her Dad live in a beach hut on an otherwise deserted beach. They give the impression of a family living 'off grid' with their patched clothes and Dad's plain look - their transport is an old van, and Lily having only a seagull for friendship and most of her toys composed of 'sea treasure' found on the beach.

In episode 35 "Goodbye Seabird" Lily is presented a framed photograph, from her father, showing a slightly younger Lily, her father and a blonde-haired lady by her father's side. The episode deals with the death of a seabird on Driftwood Bay and a suggestion could be that Lily's mother recently died given that Lily appears only a couple of years younger in the photograph.

Characters

Main 
Salty Dog' (Peter Mullan) is a Scottish dog and the captain of a boat called "Delilah."  He is Nonna's younger brother who lives on Driftwood Bay. His catchphrases are "All aboard for Driftwood Bay!", "Land ho!", "Aye, aye, young Lily!", "Welcome aboard, Old Delilah!", "Golden goose caps!", "Moldering mudskippers!", "Lumbering lobsters!", "Rattling razor-clams" and "Slippery scallions!" Salty takes Lily to Driftwood Bay on Old Delilah. Salty seems to be in love with Hatsie Hen.
Lily (Orlagh O’Keefe) is the protagonist of the series, an imaginative, happy-go-lucky, cheerful and feisty young 5-year-old Northern Irish red-headed girl with a vivid imagination. Lily is always accompanied by her best friend, Gull (a Seagull) who often spies "sea treasure" that is washed up on the shore by her beach hut. Once Lily finds the sea treasure, she wonders what it could be, and gets whisked away to Driftwood Bay, an island that exists only in her imagination.  During the title sequence Lily creates pictures of her animal friends with things that have washed up on the beach, which come to life on Driftwood Bay. Her catchphrases are "Sea treasure!", "Every day, a new adventure washes up on the beach!", "Hoop-dee-doo!", "Hooray!", "Across the way on Driftwood Bay!", "Come on, Gull!", "Aye, aye, Captain Salty!" and "What is it, Gull?"
Bull Dozer (Ardal O'Hanlon) is an Irish bull who wears a red neckerchief (or scarf) and lives on Driftwood Bay.
Nonna Dog (Annette Crosbie) is a Scottish dog who is Salty's older sister and the owner of the Cockle Cafe on Driftwood Bay.
Hatsie Hen (Tameka Empson) is a train-driving English hen who wears goggles at great speed and Salty seems to be in love with. She lives on Driftwood Bay.
Wee Rabbit (Jane Horrocks) is a Welsh rabbit who wears a pink dress and lives on Driftwood Bay. She is shy and loves art.
Lord Stag (Stephen Fry) is an English stag who wears a head reflector and lives in Stag Castle on Driftwood Bay.
Dad (Richard Dormer) is Lily's Dad who loves her and stays at home, always there when she returns from her adventures.
Gull (Paul Currie) is Lily's best friend who is a seagull and is very squawky and talkative.
Puffin (Paul Currie) as his name implies, is a puffin who lives on Driftwood Bay.

Special guests
Noleen Hen (Dolly Parton) is a famous American country singer/songwriter and guitarist who gets washed up in a storm on Driftwood Bay. She appears in the episode "The Salty Chicken."
Dredger Tom Fox (Robert Brydon) is the antagonist of the series. Tom is a seafaring Welsh silver fox who is Nonna's former childhood sweetheart. He appears in the episode "The Proposal."
Roweena Rabbit (Imelda Staunton) is Wee Rabbit's sister who appears in "Fabulous Darling"

Episodes

Season 1 (2014)

Season 2 (2017)

Home video history
UK
Abbey Home Media Group (2016)
USA
NCircle Entertainment (2016)

Broadcast
The series premiered on Universal Kids in the United States on 12 May and on ABC in Australia on 19 May 2014. In Ireland, it airs on RTÉ.
It used to air on Channel 5 - Milkshake! in the UK, Piwi+ in France in August 2016. In Canada it was broadcast on Family Jr. on September 3, 2016, then season 2 aired on TVO Kids in August 2017.

References

External links
Official website

2014 British television series debuts
2017 British television series endings
2010s British animated television series
2010s British children's television series
British children's animated adventure television series
British children's animated comedy television series
British flash animated television series
British preschool education television series
Irish children's animated adventure television series
Irish children's animated comedy television series
English-language television shows
Channel 5 (British TV channel) original programming
ITV children's television shows
Animated television series about children
Animated television series about dogs
Television series about chickens
Animated television series about rabbits and hares
Television series about deer and moose
Animated television series about birds
Animated preschool education television series
2010s preschool education television series
Television shows set in Northern Ireland